George Hartshorn Hodges (February 6, 1866 – October 7, 1947) was an American politician and the 19th Governor of Kansas (1913–1915).

Biography
Hodges was born in Orion, Wisconsin, in Richland County. His family moved to Olathe, Kansas, when he was three years old. He received his education in the public schools. He married Ora May Murray and they had two children.

Career
Hodges had a successful career as a businessman with holdings in the lumber, hardware, and the loan industries, as well as owning a newspaper, the Johnson County Democrat.

Hodges was elected to the Olathe City Council in 1896, serving alongside his brother, Mayor Frank Hodges. George Hodges was elected to one term as Mayor of Olathe after his four year as a city councilman.

Hodges served in the state legislature as a senator from 1905 to 1913, where he was particularly active on the railroad committee in the senate and known for leading the charge for progressive laws for the state of Kansas.

He was the unsuccessful Democratic nominee for governor in 1910 and was elected governor in 1912, defeating Republican Arthur Capper by 23 votes in the closest election in Kansas history.

In his January 14, 1913, State of the State Address, Hodges called for equal suffrage for women, the direct election of U.S. Senators, closed primary elections, to allow taxation on mortgages held by non-residents of Kansas on property owned in Kansas, repeal of the inheritance law, expansion of the state's mileage of permanent dirt roads, an overhaul of the state's grain inspection law, new child labor laws, new employment safety laws, a review of proposals for the state to publish school textbooks, the reduction of contingency funds for statewide officeholders excluding the state attorney general, giving the state new powers over river beds, the merger of the state livestock sanitary commissioner into Kansas State University and an elected state labor commissioner with additional powers.

Hodges also used his inaugural address to call for four amendments to the state constitution:  
Permitting statewide initiative and referendum 
Permitting recall of elected officials
Expanding statewide and county officials terms from two years to four years
State aid for road and bridge construction

The administration of Governor Hodges brought the following changes:
a corporation tax was sanctioned
a women's suffrage amendment to the state constitution was authorized
the board of administration was granted power to control all state agencies
Control of all state schools was placed under the State Board of Education
Repeal of the inheritance tax
New power for the Kansas Bureau of Labor
Allowed for the state publication of school textbooks
New miner safety laws
Created a hospital for patients with tuberculous
Placed public hospitals under the control of county governments
Created the office of prison matron for women's county jails
Created the office of divorce proctor 
women's roles were advanced in state government.

On March 10, 1913, he delivered a speech to the Kansas Legislature calling for an overhaul of the Legislature by combining the Kansas House of Representatives and Kansas Senate into a single Legislative Assembly, consisting of one or two members from each congressional district with the governor serving as the presiding officer. He said the size of the Legislature was too large for the state.

Hodges also proposed moving the state from having legislative sessions in odd number years to holding annual legislative sessions, suggesting the biennium procedure caused legislators to rush through their business and not have ample time to study legislation.

Hodges was the last governor of Kansas to serve with a Democratic legislature. After losing his reelection bid, Hodges returned to his various business interests as he had established a successful career as a businessman. He was a member of the State Board of Regents from 1925 to 1927. He also served on the State Textbook Commission.

References

External links
 
National Governors Association article on George Hartshorn Hodges
Political Graveyard

Speeches delivered by Governor Hodges
Online resources on George H. Hodges at Kansas Memory website
Publications concerning Kansas Governor Hodges's administration available via the KGI Online Library

1866 births
1947 deaths
People from Richland County, Wisconsin
American Disciples of Christ
Mayors of places in Kansas
Democratic Party governors of Kansas
Democratic Party Kansas state senators
Politicians from Olathe, Kansas
People from Kansas City, Missouri